Obrochnoye is a rural locality (a village) in Mikhaylovskoye Rural Settlement, Kharovsky District, Vologda Oblast, Russia. The population was 11 as of 2002.

Geography 
Obrochnoye is located 22 km east of Kharovsk (the district's administrative centre) by road. Verkhnyaya Gorka is the nearest rural locality.

References 

Rural localities in Kharovsky District